Nagornsky is a rural locality (a settlement) in Gubakhinsky Urban okrug, Perm Krai, Russia. The population was 477 as of 2010. There are 41 streets.

Geography 
It is located 9 km south of Gubakha (the district's administrative centre) by road. Nagornaya is the nearest rural locality.

References 

Rural localities in Perm Krai